Alexander Ziegler may refer to:

Alexander Ziegler (German writer) (1822–1887), German writer and economist
Alexander Ziegler (Swiss writer) (1944–1987), Swiss writer and actor
Alexander Ziegler (athlete) (born 1987), German hammer thrower and winner of the 2015 German Athletics Championships